Hyper Hippo Entertainment is a Canadian online video game and software development company. It was co-founded by Club Penguin founder Lance Priebe and Pascale Audette, a former employee of Disney Online Studios Canada. Their current most popular games include AdVenture Capitalist and Wild Warfare, among many others.

History 
Hyper Hippo was founded by Lance Priebe and Pascale Audette in late 2012. Its original purpose was to expand the size of Priebe's old studio, RocketSnail Games, which is today used as a personal studio for independent projects by Priebe. Hyper Hippo formally inherited all of RocketSnail's projects, including Mech Mice and Leviathans Online.

In November 2012, Catalyst Game Labs announced a partnership with Hyper Hippo to create Leviathans Online. Later in December 2012, Wireds GeekDad also reported about Catalyst Games and Hyper Hippo Games possibly partnering.

In 2015, they published a revamped version of browser game AdVenture Capitalist for mobile.

In February 2016, Jagex announced a partnership with Hyper Hippo to create RuneScape: Idle Adventures a spin-off of RuneScape described as a quick-to-play RPG that can be played "in just a few moments each day". On September 1, 2016, an early access beta was released through Steam on PC. The game was also planned to be released on mobile devices but was shut down and removed from Steam on May 15, 2017.

References

Software companies of Canada
Companies based in Kelowna
Video game companies of Canada
Canadian companies established in 2012
Software companies established in 2012
2012 establishments in British Columbia